Heisey is a surname. Notable people with the surname include:

A. H. Heisey (1842–1922), American businessman
Alan Heisey (born 1954), Canadian lawyer
Alan Milliken Heisey Sr. (1928–2014), Canadian writer, politician and activist 
Chris Heisey (born 1984), American baseball player
Karl Brooks Heisey (1895-1937) Canadian mining engineer 
Lawrence Heisey (1930–2009), Canadian businessman and philanthropist

See also
Heisey Glass Company, defunct American glassmaking company
Heisey House, historic house in Lock Haven, Pennsylvania, United States